Adrian Virginius (30 November 1663 – 8 August 1706) was a Baltic-German clergyman, translator and linguist.

From 1686 to 1694, he worked as a pastor in Puhja, Tartu County. In 1694 he continued its clerical work in Otepää.

He was the editor and publisher of the "Wastne Testament" ('The New Testament'), which was written in South Estonian dialect. This book is the first complete print of the New Testament in Estonian language. At the same time, this is the first book that was completely written in Estonian.

References

1663 births
1703 deaths
Baltic-German people
Estophiles